"Why You Wanna Treat Me So Bad?" is the US follow-up single to Prince's first big hit, "I Wanna Be Your Lover". It is also Prince's first rock and roll-inspired single release. It did not make the top 40 of the Billboard Hot 100 charts, although it did reach #13 on the R&B Singles charts. The lyrics explore a relationship with a cruel lover.  The song prominently features guitar and bass, with the keyboard featured in a less prominent role.  A highlight of the song is a soaring guitar solo at the end, played by Prince himself.

The song was played live on Prince's first three tours, always being the second number. The extended lyrics on the live version continue the main theme, although, later on the Dirty Mind tour, these were replaced by screaming "bitch!" and following this with a blazing guitar solo.  The B-side of the song was "Baby" (from For You) in the US and "Bambi" in New Zealand.

In 1987, the song was covered by American actress turned singer Tuesday Knight's self-titled debut album.

In September 2009, Prince released a recording of a live performance of the song at Paisley Park Studios on the Internet.

Charts

References

Prince (musician) songs
Songs written by Prince (musician)
1980 singles
Warner Records singles
1979 songs
Song recordings produced by Prince (musician)